Alberni Valley Regional Airport  is located  northwest of Port Alberni, British Columbia, Canada.

See also
 List of airports on Vancouver Island

References

External links

Registered aerodromes in British Columbia
Port Alberni